Shatha (Arabic: shadha شذى - shortened written form, شذا - full-long written form), also spelt Shada, is an Arabic female given name meaning "scent, fragrant, aroma" (with a base note of fragrance notes). 

The name may also refer to the "perfume, scent of musk". 

Literally, it refers to the act of "the strength, intensity and scattering, diffusing smell by breaking the young oudh (agarwood) to be perfumed (on oneself) with it."

Notable people with the name include:
 
Shatha Abdul Razzak Abbousi, Iraqi women's rights activist
Shatha Hassoun, Shada Hassoun, Iraqi female singer
Shada Nasser, Yemeni lawyer
Shatha Mousa Sadiq, Iraqi politician

References

Arabic feminine given names